The 135 Squadron of the Israeli Air Force, also known as the Air Kings Squadron.

This squadron operate a Beechcraft Super King Air 200 ("Tzofit" and "Kokiya") and Beechcraft A36 Bonanza ("Khofit").

The squadron based at Sde Dov Airport.

References

Israeli Air Force squadrons